Epicorsia chicalis is a moth in the family Crambidae. It was described by Eugene G. Munroe in 1978. It is found in Honduras.

References

Moths described in 1978
Pyraustinae